Duncan Ian Watmore (born 8 March 1994) is an English professional footballer who plays as a forward for Championship club Millwall. Watmore previously played for Altrincham, Clitheroe, Curzon Ashton, Sunderland and Hibernian.

Early life
Watmore was born in Manchester and is the son of Ian Watmore, a former chief executive of the Football Association. He was educated at Cheadle Hulme School.

Career

Early career
Watmore started his career at Manchester United, but was released at the age of 12. He joined Altrincham in their youth team at the age of 16. He made his first-team debut on 27 November 2011 as a substitute in a 2–1 away defeat to F.C. United of Manchester in the FA Trophy. Watmore had spells on loan at Northern Premier League Division One North clubs Clitheroe and Curzon Ashton in early 2012. He scored 14 goals for Altrincham in the 2012–13 season.

Sunderland

Watmore signed for Premier League club Sunderland on 24 May 2013 for an undisclosed fee on a two-year contract. He made his debut for the Sunderland first team on 5 January 2014 as a 60th-minute substitute for Ji Dong-won in a 3–1 home win against Carlisle United in the third round of the FA Cup.

On 31 January 2014, Watmore joined Scottish Premiership club Hibernian on loan for the rest of the 2013–14 season. His first goal came on 15 March 2014 in a 3–1 defeat away to Partick Thistle. Watmore left Hibernian at the end of the season.

On 29 May 2015, Watmore was named the U21 Premier League Player of the Season, after scoring 11 goals in 19 matches in the competition.

Watmore made his league debut for Sunderland on 15 August 2015, coming off the bench to score a late consolation goal with a scuffed volley into the bottom-left corner in a 3–1 home loss to Norwich City. He signed a new four-year contract with Sunderland on 22 November 2015. Watmore returned from two months out with an ankle injury on 16 April 2016 as a half time substitute away to Norwich City, and scored the third goal in Sunderland's 3–0 victory, a result which brought the team to within a point of Norwich in the relegation battle.

Watmore was ruled out for the remainder of the a 2016–17 season after suffering cruciate knee ligament injury during Sunderland's 2–1 home win over Leicester City on 3 December 2016.

It was announced on 17 June 2020 that Watmore would be leaving Sunderland, bringing to an end his 7 years at the club.

Middlesbrough
On 17 November 2020, Watmore signed for Middlesbrough on a short-term deal until January 2021. He scored his first goals for Middlesbrough when he scored twice in a 2–0 win against Swansea City on 2 December 2020. Watmore continued his goal scoring with two on 12 December in a 3–0 win against Millwall.
On 7 January 2021, Watmore signed a new two-and-a-half year deal at Middlesbrough. Watmore's performances earned him the championship player of the month for December. Watmore was Middlesbrough's top scorer for the 2020–21 season, with nine goals.

Millwall
On 31 January 2023, Watmore signed for Millwall for an undisclosed fee.

International career
Watmore made his debut for England under-20s on 28 May 2015 in the 2015 Toulon Tournament, scoring England's second goal in a 3–3 draw with Morocco. He was named in the Team of the Tournament and was also voted as the Revelation of the Tournament. He made five appearances and scored two goals for the under-20s in 2015.

In August 2015, Watmore was called up to the England under-21 squad for the first time. He made his debut against the United States on 3 September 2015 as a second-half substitute, and assisted James Wilson's winning goal. Watmore scored his first under-21 goal and assisted two others on 14 November 2015 after coming on as a substitute against Switzerland in a 2017 UEFA European Under-21 Championship qualifier. He was part of the team that won the 2016 Toulon Tournament, their first such win for 22 years. He scored three goals in 13 appearances for the under-21s from 2015 to 2016.

Style of play
Watmore plays as a winger. In November 2015, Sunderland forward Jermain Defoe likened Watmore to Gareth Bale, his former Tottenham Hotspur teammate, citing a shared ability of ball control.

Personal life
Watmore continued studying for a degree in economics and business management after signing for Sunderland, transferring from the University of Manchester to Newcastle University. He graduated with a first-class honours degree in December 2015. In 2017 whilst on holiday in Barbados Watmore reportedly helped save three pensioners from the water after a boat crash.

Career statistics

Honours
England U21
Toulon Tournament: 2016

Individual
Altrincham Player of the Year: 2012–13
Altrincham Goal of the Year: 2012–13
Sunderland Supporters' Young Player of the Year: 2015–16
U21 Premier League Player of the Season: 2014–15
Toulon Tournament Team of the Tournament: 2015
Toulon Tournament Revelation of the Tournament: 2015
EFL Championship Player of the Month:December 2020.

References

External links

Profile at the Sunderland A.F.C. website

1994 births
Living people
Footballers from Manchester
English footballers
England youth international footballers
England under-21 international footballers
Association football wingers
Manchester United F.C. players
Altrincham F.C. players
Clitheroe F.C. players
Curzon Ashton F.C. players
Sunderland A.F.C. players
Hibernian F.C. players
Middlesbrough F.C. players
Millwall F.C. players
National League (English football) players
Scottish Professional Football League players
Premier League players
English Football League players
People educated at Cheadle Hulme School
Alumni of the University of Manchester
Alumni of Newcastle University